Waterhen River may refer to the following rivers in Canada:

Waterhen River (Manitoba), a tributary of Lake Manitoba
Waterhen River (Saskatchewan), a tributary of the Beaver River